Canadian Broadcasting Corp. v. New Brunswick (Attorney General) [1996] 3 SCR 480 was a decision by the Supreme Court of Canada concerning the open court principle.

Background 

At a sentencing hearing for sexual assault, the trial judge excluded the public and the media from the courtroom for parts of the sentencing through an exclusion order made under section 486(1) of the Criminal Code. The Canadian Broadcasting Corporation challenged the constitutionality of s. 486(1) as an infringement on the freedom of the press under section 2(b) of the Canadian Charter of Rights and Freedoms. The Court of Queen's Bench of New Brunswick found that s. 2(b) had been infringed, but that the infringement was justifiable under s. 1 of the Charter.

Decision 
On appeal, the Supreme Court unanimously upheld the constitutionality of s. 486(1), but quashed the exclusion order. La Forest J. found that the trial judge erred in issuing the order. He found that although in general deference should be given to the judge's exercise of his discretion, in the instant case the order was not necessary to further the proper administration of justice.

References

Canadian freedom of expression case law
Supreme Court of Canada cases
1996 in Canadian case law
Publication bans in Canadian case law
Canadian Broadcasting Corporation
New Brunswick litigation